Nanpu Station is a metro station on Line 2 of the Guangzhou Metro. The underground station is located in Bigui Avenue, Nanpu Island in the Panyu District of Guangzhou near the Guangzhou Country Garden.

Station layout

Neighboring Buildings  
 Guangzhou Country Garden
 Guangzhou Bailong Bay

Railway stations in China opened in 2010
Guangzhou Metro stations in Panyu District